KRSK (105.1 FM, "105.1 The Buzz") is a commercial radio station licensed to Molalla, Oregon, and broadcasting to the Portland metropolitan area. It is owned by Audacy, Inc. and airs a hot adult contemporary radio format. The station broadcasts in HD Radio.  The HD-2 subchannel carries Audacy's "Channel Q" LGBTQ service.

KRSK's studios and offices are located in Portland's South Waterfront district on SW Bancroft Street.   The transmitter site is in the city's West Hills, off NW Skyline Boulevard.  KRSK has an effective radiated power (ERP) of 22,500 watts.

History
On July 3, 1970, KSLM-FM signed on the air. It was owned by Oregon Radio, Inc. and was the FM counterpart of KSLM (now KZGD).

In 1973, it changed its call sign to KORI. In 1978, KORI changed call letters to KSKD and aired the automated "TM Stereo Rock" Top 40 music service as "Cascade 105". On March 7, 1986, KSKD changed call letters to KXYQ and aired a live and local Top 40 format as "Q-105", later switching to adult contemporary. On June 15, 1995, at 5 p.m., after a few hours of stunting, KXYQ changed its format to classic rock, branded as "Earth 105", with the call letters becoming KKRH on July 17, 1995.

Entercom (now Audacy) acquired the station in 1998 for $605,000. On June 5, 1998, at 5 p.m., KKRH began its current hot adult contemporary format as "Rosie 105." It changed its call letters to the current KRSK on August 28, 1998. In January 2000, the spelling changed to "Rosey 105" after a copyright lawsuit by Rosie O'Donnell.

On April 14, 2003, KRSK rebranded as "105.1 The Buzz".

The station moved from Salem into the more lucrative Portland radio market in 2004. The city of license was changed to the Portland suburb of Molalla, and the transmitter was moved to Portland's West Hills.

In 2011, KRSK began adding more contemporary pop currents, moving the station in an Adult Top 40 direction.

HD Radio
KRSK broadcasts in the HD Radio format. In 2006, KRSK added an HD2 subcarrier to its transmitter. The HD-2 subchannel carried a comedy radio format. In July 2011, KRSK-HD2 switched to a blues format as "The Delta." On March 14, 2017, KRSK-HD2 flipped to the Radio Disney children's radio service. On June 1, 2018, KRSK-HD2 switched to a love songs/Soft AC format. In March 2019, KRSK-HD2 switched from love songs to LGBTQ talk/dance, branded as "Channel Q".

In June 2010, KRSK added an HD3 subchannel to its lineup, which broadcast ESPN Deportes Radio, a Spanish-language sports radio format, which would only last a couple of months. In August, it switched to ESPNews. That lasted until July 2011, when the HD3 subchannel was discontinued.

References

External links

RSK
Hot adult contemporary radio stations in the United States
Radio stations established in 1970
1970 establishments in Oregon
Audacy, Inc. radio stations